John Craighead (born November 23, 1971) is a retired professional ice hockey right winger. He played five games for the Toronto Maple Leafs during 1996–97 season. The rest of his career, which lasted from 1991 to 2005, was spent in the minor leagues and then in Europe.

Some sources claim that he was born in Richmond, Virginia. He spent most of his youth growing up in Vancouver, British Columbia.

He has played ice hockey for the Nottingham Panthers and the IHL's Detroit Vipers.

He holds the Deutsche Eishockey Liga record for penalty minutes for the Thomas Sabo Ice Tigers.

Career statistics

Regular season and playoffs

See also
 List of black NHL players

References

External links
 

1971 births
Living people
Black Canadian ice hockey players
Canadian expatriate ice hockey players in England
American expatriate ice hockey players in England
Canadian ice hockey right wingers
Canadian people of American descent
Cardiff Devils players
Chilliwack Chiefs players
Huntington Blizzard players
Johnstown Chiefs players
Ladner Penguins players
Louisville Icehawks players
Manitoba Moose players
Motor City Mustangs players
Nottingham Panthers players
Nürnberg Ice Tigers players
Revier Löwen players
Richmond Renegades players
Ice hockey people from Vancouver
Sunshine Hockey League players
Surrey Eagles players
Toronto Maple Leafs players
Undrafted National Hockey League players
Sportspeople from Richmond, Virginia
Ice hockey people from Virginia
Canadian expatriate ice hockey players in Wales
Canadian expatriate ice hockey players in Germany
American expatriate ice hockey players in Wales
American expatriate ice hockey players in Germany